Bryan Hines (May 14, 1896 – September 10, 1964) was an American wrestler and Olympic medalist. He competed at the 1924 Olympic Games in Paris, where he won a bronze medal in freestyle bantamweight.

References

External links
 

1896 births
1964 deaths
Wrestlers at the 1924 Summer Olympics
American male sport wrestlers
Olympic bronze medalists for the United States in wrestling
Medalists at the 1924 Summer Olympics
People from Morehead, Kentucky
Sportspeople from Kentucky
19th-century American people
20th-century American people